USS YP-74 (ex-Endeavor) was a converted fishing vessel which served as an auxiliary patrol boat in the U.S. Navy during World War II.

History
She was built in Seattle, Washington for the benefit of M.C. Wright of Seattle. She was launched in April 1937, completed later in the year, configured as a purse seiner, and christened Endeavor. In November 1940, she was purchased by the United States Navy and commissioned in December 1940. She was designated as a Yard patrol boat (YP). Her armament consisted of a single 3"/23 caliber gun. She was assigned along with two other converted fishing vessels ( and ) to the newly created Alaska Sector of the 13th Naval District under Captain R. C. Parker who was tasked with building up the nearly absent Naval defenses of Alaska and the Aleutian Islands. In December 1941, Lieutenant John Backland USNR was named commanding officer. Once in Alaska, she and her fellow YPs joined the former Coast Guard cutter  and the gunboat  to form what was colloquially called the "Alaskan Navy." Commandeer Charles E. ("Squeaky") Anderson, USNR, a "local character of infinite resource, energy, and cunning", was responsible for the YP fleet taking YP-72 as his flagship. In March 1942, Lieutenant George White Snyder was named commanding officer. Although there were 21 survivors, 2 crew members and 2 passengers did not survive. She was struck from the Naval List.

References

1937 ships
Auxiliary ships of the United States Navy
Ships built in Seattle
Maritime incidents in September 1942
Yard patrol boats of the United States Navy
Ships of the Aleutian Islands campaign